Caloptilia saccisquamata is a moth of the family Gracillariidae. It is known from Guangdong, China.

References

saccisquamata
Moths of Asia